Draganić is municipality in Karlovac County, Croatia. The municipality consists of the villages of Lug, Goljak, Mrzljaki, Jazvaci, Darići, Budrovci, Bencetici, Barkovići, Draganići, Lazina, Franetici, Vrbanci, and Vrh.

The combined population is 2,741, of whom 96% are Croats.

Draganić is the birthplace of Ivan Biličić and Marija Barković, paternal grandparents of Bill Belichick, an American football head coach. Belichick is considered by many to be the greatest coach of all time and he holds several coaching records, including the most playoff wins, the most Superbowl appearances and the most Superbowl wins.

References

External links 

 

Municipalities of Croatia
Populated places in Karlovac County